This list of Brigham Young University Hawaii alumni includes notable graduates, non-graduate former students, and current students of Brigham Young University Hawaii (BYUH).

Academia and research

Arts

Business and finance

Entertainment

Government, law, and public policy

Journalism, media, literature, writing, and translation

Music

Religion 
Note: all positions listed are within the Church of Jesus Christ of Latter-day Saints unless otherwise noted.

Sports

Other

See also 
 :Category:Brigham Young University–Hawaii alumni

References

External links 
 BYU Hawaii Alumni

 
Brigham Young University Hawaii alumni
Brigham Young University